

',-," 
 'Pataphysics"

0–9 

 14th Dalai Lama
 16 Questions on the Assassination
 1649 in philosophy
 1658 in philosophy
 17th-century philosophy
 18th-century philosophy
 1919 United States anarchist bombings
 1922 in philosophy
 1926 in philosophy
 1962 in philosophy
 1972 in philosophy
 1973 in philosophy
 1974 in philosophy
 1975 in philosophy
 1976 in philosophy
 1977 in philosophy
 1978 in philosophy
 1979 in philosophy
 1980 in philosophy
 19th-century philosophy
 20th-century philosophy
 20th-century Western painting

A 

 A-series and B-series
 A Buyer's Market
 A Calendar of Wisdom
 A Conflict of Visions
 A Contribution to the Critique of Political Economy
 A Defence of Common Sense
 A Defense of Abortion
 A Dissertation on Liberty and Necessity, Pleasure and Pain
 A Few Words on Non-Intervention
 A Fórmula de Deus
 A fortiori argument
 A General View of Positivism
 A Grief Observed
 A Guide for the Perplexed
 A Happy Death
 A History of God
 A History of Murphy's Law
 A History of Philosophy (Copleston)
 A History of Western Philosophy
 A las Barricadas
 A Legend of Old Egypt
 A Letter Concerning Toleration
 A maiore ad minus
 A Mathematician's Apology
 A Message from the Emperor
 A minore ad maius
 A New Era of Thought
 A New Model of the Universe
 A New Philosophy of Society: Assemblage Theory and Social Complexity
 A New Refutation of Time
 A Philosophical Enquiry into the Origin of Our Ideas of the Sublime and Beautiful
 A posteriori
 A priori (philosophy)
 A priori and a posteriori
 A Salty Piece of Land
 A Scanner Darkly
 A Secular Humanist Declaration
 A Short History of Chinese Philosophy
 A System of Logic
 A Thousand Plateaus
 A Thousand Years of Nonlinear History
 A Treatise Concerning the Principles of Human Knowledge
 A Treatise of Human Nature
 A Vindication of Natural Society
 A Vindication of the Rights of Men
 A Vindication of the Rights of Woman
 A Voyage to Arcturus
 A. A. Long
 A. A. Luce
 A. C. Ewing
 A. C. Grayling
 A. D. Gordon
 A. H. Almaas
 A. H. Armstrong
 A. J. Baker (philosopher)
 A. V. Dicey
 A. W. Benn
 A. P. Martinich
 A. R. Natarajan
 Ab ovo
 Abacus logic
 Abahlali baseMjondolo
 Abandonment (existentialism)
 Abas (sophist)
 Abbasgulu Bakikhanov
 Abd al-Karīm ibn Hawāzin al-Qushayri
 Abd al-Rahman al-Kawakibi
 Abd al-Rahman Ibn Khaldun
 Abdallah ibn Yasin
 Abdel-Halim Mahmoud
 Abdel Rahman Badawi
 Abdel Wahab Elmessiri
 Abderites
 Abdoldjavad Falaturi
 Abdolkarim Soroush
 Abductive logic programming
 Abductive reasoning
 Abductive validation
 Abdullah Yusuf Azzam
 Abdurrahman Ibn Khaldun
 Abdurrahmān Ibn Khaldūn
 Abel Paz
 Abhayakaragupta
 Abhidhamma Pitaka
 Abhidharma
 Abhinavagupta
 Abilene paradox
 Abimael Guzmán
 Abjection
 Abjunction
 Abner of Burgos
 Abner Shimony
 Abolishing the Borders from Below
 Abortion
 Abortion debate
 Aboutness
 Abraham Abigdor
 Abraham Abulafia
 Abraham bar Hiyya
 Abraham ben Moses Maimon
 Abraham ben Moses Maimonides
 Abraham Cohen de Herrera
 Abraham Edel
 Abraham ibn Daud
 Abraham Ibn Daud
 Abraham ibn Ezra
 Abraham Ibn Ezra
 Abraham Isaac Kook
 Abraham Joshua Heschel
 Abraham Kaplan
 Abraham Kovoor
 Abraham Leon
 Abraham Robinson
 Abraham Tucker
 Abraham Yagel
 Abraham Yehudah Khein
 Abram Deborin
 Absolute (philosophy)
 Absolute atheism
 Absolute idealism
 Absolute Infinite
 Absolute space
 Absolute theory
 Absolute threshold
 Absolute time
 Absolute truth
 Abstinence
 Abstract art
 Abstract entity
 Abstract expressionism
 Abstract Illusionism
 Abstract Imagists
 Abstract labour and concrete labour
 Abstract object
 Abstract objects
 Abstract particulars
 Abstract process
 Abstract semantic graph
 Abstraction
 Abstraction (philosophy)
 Abstractionism
 Absurdism
 Abu'l Hasan Muhammad Ibn Yusuf al-'Amiri
 Abu'l Walid Muhammad Ibn Rushd
 Abu 'Ali al-Husayn Ibn Sina
 Abu al-Hakam al-Kirmani
 Abu al-Hasan al-Ash'ari
 Abu Bakr Ibn Bajja
 Abu Bakr Ibn Bājja
 Abu Bakr Ibn Ţufayl
 Abu Bakr Muhammad Ibn Tufayl
 Abu Bakr Muhammad Ibn Yahya Ibn as-Say'igh Ibn Bajja
 Abu Bakr Muhammad Ibn Zakariyya' al-Razi
 Abu Hamid al-Ghazali
 Abu Hamid Muhammad al-Ghazali
 Abū Hayyān al-Tawhīdī
 Abu Mansur Maturidi
 Abu Muhammad 'Ali Ibn Hazm
 Abu Nasr al-Farabi
 Abū Nasr al-Fārābī
 Abu Rayhan Biruni
 Abu Sulayman al-Sijistani
 Abu Sulayman Muhammad al-Sijistani
 Abu Tahir Marwazi
 Abu Yaqub Sijistani
 Abu Yusuf Ya'qub ibn Ishaq al-Kindi
 Abul Ala Maududi
 Academic art
 Academic authorship
 Academic freedom
 Academic skepticism
 Academy
 Acatalepsy
 Accademia degli Infiammati
 Accent
 Acceptance
 Accessibility
 Accessibility relation
 Accident
 Accident (fallacy)
 Accident (philosophy)
 Accidental necessity
 Accidental properties
 Accidental property
 Accidentalism
 Accidie
 Accountability
 Accountant-client privilege
 Accounting ethics
 Accounting reform
 Accumulation by dispossession
 Acharya Hemachandra
 Achieving Our Country
 Achille Gagliardi
 Achille Varzi (philosopher)
 Achilles paradox
 Achintya Bheda Abheda
 Acosmism
 Acquaintance
 Acquiescence bias
 Acquired taste
 Acrasia
 Acratas
 Acrion
 Act utilitarianism
 Acting Out (book)
 Action (philosophy)
 Action at a distance
 Action Philosophers!
 Action theory (philosophy)
 Action verb
 Active citizenship
 Active intellect
 Actor–observer bias
 Acts of Literature
 Acts of the Apostles
 Actual idealism
 Actual Idealism
 Actual infinite
 Actual infinity
 Actualism
 Actualist
 Actuality
 Actuel Marx
 Actus et potentia
 Actus primus
 Actus purus
 Acumenus
 Acyutananda
 Ad captandum
 Ad feminam
 Ad hoc
 Ad hoc hypothesis
 Ad hominem
 Ad hominem argument
 Ad infinitum
 Ad nauseam
 Ada Albrecht
 Adalbertus Ranconis de Ericinio
 Adam Burski
 Adam de Buckfield
 Adam de Wodeham
 Adam Ferguson
 Adam Ignacy Zabellewicz
 Adam Karl August von Eschenmayer
 Adam Mahrburg
 Adam Morton
 Adam Müller
 Adam of Łowicz
 Adam Parvipontanus
 Adam Pulchrae Mulieris
 Adam Schaff
 Adam Smith
 Adam Steuart
 Adam Tanner (mathematician)
 Adam Weishaupt
 Adam Wodeham
 Adam Zachary Newton
 Adamantios Korais
 Adamites
 Adaptation
 Adaptive bias
 Adaptive grammar
 Adaptive representation
 Adaptive system
 Addiction
 Addison Webster Moore
 Addition (logic)
 Adela Cortina
 Adelard of Bath
 Adevism
 Adi Ophir
 Adi Sanakara Philosophy
 Adi Shankara
 Adiaphora
 Adicity
 Admissible rule
 Adolf Grunbaum
 Adolf Grünbaum
 Adolf Lasson
 Adolf Lindenbaum
 Adolf Reinach
 Adolf von Harnack
 Adolfo Sánchez Vázquez
 Adolfo Veber Tkalčević
 Adolph Stöhr
 Adrastus of Aphrodisias
 Adriaan Koerbagh
 Adrian Piper
 Adriana Cavarero
 Adriano Tilgher (philosopher)
 Adrianus
 Adrsta
 Adultery
 Advaita
 Advaita Vedanta
 Advance health care directive
 Adventures of Wim
 Adverbs
 Adverse effect
 Advertising
 Advice (opinion)
 Aedesia
 Aedesius
 Aeneas of Gaza
 Aenesidemus
 Aenesidemus (book)
 Aequiprobabilism
 Aesara
 Aeschines of Neapolis
 Aeschines of Sphettus
 Aesthetic distance
 Aesthetic emotions
 Aesthetic of Ugliness
 Aesthetic Realism
 Aesthetic relativism
 Aestheticism
 Aestheticization of politics
 Aestheticization of violence
 Aesthetics
 Aesthetics of music
 Aeterni Patris
 Aether
 Aether (classical element)
 Aetius (philosopher)
 Affect (philosophy)
 Affect heuristic
 Affection
 Affectionism
 Affective
 Affective forecasting
 Affine logic
 Affirmative action
 Affirmative conclusion from a negative premise
 Affirming a disjunct
 Affirming the antecedent
 Affirming the consequent
 African philosophy
 African Spir
 African Uplands
 Africana philosophy
 Africana womanism
 Afrikan Spir
 Afshin Ellian
 After Many a Summer
 After Virtue
 Afterlife
 Against Civilization: Readings and Reflections
 Against His-Story, Against Leviathan
 Against the Day
 Āgama (Buddhism)
 Āgama (Hinduism)
 Āgama (Jainism)
 Agama Hindu Dharma
 Agapē
 Agapē Agape
 Agapius of Athens
 Agathism
 Agathobulus
 Agathon
 Agathosthenes
 Agathusia and aschimothusia
 Age of Enlightenment
 Age of reason
 Age of reason (canon law)
 Agency (philosophy)
 Agent (law)
 Agent Communications Language
 Aggadah
 Aggression
 Aggressionism
 Ágnes Heller
 Agnostic
 Agnostic atheism
 Agnostic existentialism
 Agnostic theism
 Agnosticism
 Agonism
 Agonistic liberalism
 Agonistic pluralism
 Agorism
 Agostinho da Silva
 Agostino Nifo
 Agrarianism
 Agricultural philosophy
 Agrippa the Skeptic
 Ahad Ha'am
 Ahamkāra
 Ahankara
 Ahimsa
 Ahimsa in Jainism
 Ahistoricism
 Ahl ar-ra'y
 Ahmad Ahmadi (philosopher)
 Ahmad Fardid
 Ahmad Ibn Muhammad Ibn Miskawayh
 Ahmad Nadeem Qasimi
 Ahmad Sirhindi
 Ahmed Hulusi
 Ahura Mazda
 AI effect
 Ai Siqi
 Aijaz Ahmad
 Aizawa Seishisai
 Ajahn Amaro
 Ajahn Chah
 Ajahn Sumedho
 Ajahn Sundara
 Ajita Kesakambali
 Ajivika
 AK Press
 Ākāśa
 Akeel Bilgrami
 Akira Asada
 Akira Yamada
 Akka Mahadevi
 Akrasia
 Al-Farabi
 Al-Fārābī
 Al-Ghazali
 Al-Ghazālī
 Al-Hajj Salim Suwari
 Al-Hilli
 Al-Jahiz
 Al-Jubba'i
 Al-Juwayni
 Al-Khazini
 Al-Khidr
 Al-Kindi
 Al-Kindī
 Al-Ma`arri
 Al-Mawardi
 Al-Nahda
 Al-Rāzī
 Al-Shahrastani
 Al-Shahrazuri
 Al-Shirazi
 Al-Sijistani
 Al-Tabarani
 Al-Tawhidi
 Al-Zamakhshari
 Al Amiri
 Alain Badiou
 Alain de Benoist
 Alain de Botton
 Alain de Lille
 Alain Etchegoyen
 Alain Finkielkraut
 Alain LeRoy Locke
 Alan Carter (philosopher)
 Alan Donagan
 Alan Gewirth
 Alan Grant (writer)
 Alan Mathison Turing
 Alan Millar
 Alan Moore
 Alan Musgrave
 Alan of Lynn
 Alan Ross Anderson
 Alan Ryan
 Alan Soble
 Alan Stout (philosopher)
 Alan Turing
 Alan Watts
 Alan Woods (politician)
 Alasdair C. MacIntyre
 Alasdair MacIntyre
 Alasdair Urquhart
 Alastair Hannay
 Alastair Norcross
 Ālaya-vijñāna
 Albert (short story)
 Albert Blumberg
 Albert Borgmann
 Albert Camus
 Albert Chernenko
 Albert Einstein
 Albert Lautman
 Albert Meltzer
 Albert of Saxony (philosopher)
 Albert Outler
 Albert Parsons
 Albert Rivaud
 Albert Schwegler
 Albert Schweitzer
 Albert Venn Dicey
 Alberto Jori
 Alberto Moreiras
 Alberto Toscano
 Albertus Magnus
 Albinus (philosopher)
 Albrecht Ritschl
 Albrecht von Müller
 Albrecht Wellmer
 Alchemy
 Alcinous (philosopher)
 Alciphron (book)
 Alcmaeon of Croton
 Alcuin
 Aldo Gargani
 Alejandro Deustua
 Alejandro Korn
 Alejandro Rossi
 Alejandro Rozitchner
 Aleksander Świętochowski
 Aleksandr Danilovich Aleksandrov
 Aleksandr Ivanovich Herzen
 Aleksandr Zinovyev
 Aleksei Losev
 Aleksey Khomyakov
 Alenka Zupančič
 Aleš Ušeničnik
 Alessandro Achillini
 Alessandro Piccolomini
 Aletheia
 Alethiology
 Alex Callinicos
 Alex Comfort
 Alex Grey
 Alexamenus of Teos
 Alexander Atabekian
 Alexander Bain
 Alexander Berkman
 Alexander Bogdanov
 Alexander Bonini
 Alexander Bryan Johnson
 Alexander Campbell Fraser
 Alexander Crombie
 Alexander Esenin-Volpin
 Alexander George (philosopher)
 Alexander Gerard
 Alexander Gottlieb Baumgarten
 Alexander Herzen
 Alexander Meiklejohn
 Alexander Neckam
 Alexander Neckham
 Alexander Nehamas
 Alexander of Aegae
 Alexander of Aphrodisias
 Alexander of Hales
 Alexander Pfänder
 Alexander Piatigorsky
 Alexander Rosenberg
 Alexander S. Kechris
 Alexander Schapiro
 Alexander Sutherland (educator)
 Alexander Tille
 Alexandr Ivanovich Herzen
 Alexandre Kojeve
 Alexandre Kojève
 Alexandre Koyré
 Alexandrian school
 Alexandros Schinas
 Alexandru Bogdan-Piteşti
 Alexandru Dragomir
 Alexicrates
 Alexinus
 Alexis de Tocqueville
 Alexis Kagame
 Alexis Rosenbaum
 Alexius Meinong
 Alf Ahlberg
 Alf Ross
 Alfonso Falero
 Alfred Adler
 Alfred Baeumler
 Alfred Binet
 Alfred Brunswig
 Alfred Edward Taylor
 Alfred Espinas
 Alfred Henry Lloyd
 Alfred Horn
 Alfred I. Tauber
 Alfred Jules Ayer
 Alfred Jules Émile Fouillée
 Alfred Kastil
 Alfred Loisy
 Alfred Mele
 Alfred North Whitehead
 Alfred of Sareshel
 Alfred Rosenberg
 Alfred Russel Wallace
 Alfred Schmidt (philosopher)
 Alfred Schutz
 Alfred Schütz
 Alfred Sohn-Rethel
 Alfred Tarski
 Alfred Wilm
 Alfredo M. Bonanno
 Algazel
 Algebra
 Algebraic normal form
 Algernon Charles Swinburne
 Algorithm
 Alhazen
 Alic Halford Smith
 Alice Ambrose
 Alice Bailey
 Alice von Hildebrand
 Alienation
 Alison Wylie
 All
 All About Love: New Visions
 All and Everything
 All horses are the same color
 All men are created equal
 All That Is Solid Melts into Air
 All Truth Is God's Truth
 Allan Antliff
 Allan Bloom
 Allan Gibbard
 Allan Gotthelf
 Allan Ramsay (1713-1784)
 Allegory of the cave
 Allegory of the Cave
 Allen Buchanan
 Alois Riehl
 Alon Ben-Meir
 Alonso Gutiérrez
 Alonzo Church
 Aloys Hirt
 Alpha et Omega
 Alphabet of human thought
 Alphonso Lingis
 Altered state of consciousness
 Alterity
 Alternative denial
 Alternative dispute resolution
 Alternative Media Project
 Alternative Press Review
 Altheides
 Altruism
 Alvin Goldman
 Alvin Plantinga
 Always already
 Ama-gi
 Amadeo Bordiga
 Amafinius
 Amakasu Incident
 Amalric of Bena
 Amartya K. Sen
 Amartya Sen
 Ambiguity
 Ambiguity effect
 Ambrose
 Ambrosius Theodosius Macrobius
 Amelius
 America at the Crossroads
 American Bar Association Model Code of Professional Responsibility
 American Bar Association Model Rules of Professional Conduct
 American Catholic Philosophical Association
 American Catholic Philosophical Quarterly
 American Craftsman
 American Empire (style)
 American Enlightenment
 American Indian Movement
 American Journal of Bioethics
 American Philosophical Association
 American Philosophical Quarterly
 American Philosophical Society
 American philosophy
 American realism
 American Society for Political and Legal Philosophy
 Amerika (novel)
 Amicus Plato, sed magis amica veritas
 Amilcar Cabral
 Amílcar Cabral
 Amilcare Cipriani
 Ammon Hennacy
 Ammonius Hermiae
 Ammonius of Alexandria (Christian philosopher)
 Ammonius of Athens
 Ammonius Saccas
 Amoralism
 Amorality
 Amos Bronson Alcott
 Amour-propre
 Amour de soi
 Amphibology
 Amphiboly
 Amsterdam Declaration
 Amy Gutmann
 Amynomachus
 An Enquiry concerning Human Understanding
 An Enquiry Concerning Human Understanding
 An Enquiry Concerning the Principles of Morals
 An Essay Concerning Human Understanding
 An Essay on the History of Civil Society
 An Essay on the Principle of Population
 An Honest Thief
 An Hyang
 An Intelligent Person's Guide to Atheism
 An Occurrence at Owl Creek Bridge
 An Sich
 Anacharsis
 Anāgāmi
 Analects
 Analects of Confucius
 Analogy
 Analogy of the divided line
 Analysis
 Analysis (journal)
 Analysis (philosophy)
 Analysis paralysis
 Analytic philosophy
 Analytic-synthetic distinction
 Analytic and synthetic knowledge
 Analytic and synthetic statements
 Analytic ethics
 Analytic hierarchy
 Analytic jurisprudence
 Analytic knowledge
 Analytic Marxism
 Analytic philosophy
 Analytic proof
 Analytic proposition
 Analytic reasoning
 Analytical hierarchy
 Analytical jurisprudence
 Analytical philosophy
 Analytical psychology
 Analytical Thomism
 Anamnesis (philosophy)
 Anamorphosis
 Anan ben David
 Ānanda
 Ananda Coomaraswamy
 Anandamaya kosha
 Anandavardhana
 Anangeon
 Ananke
 Anantarika-karma
 Anaphor
 Anaphora
 Anarch (sovereign individual)
 Anarcha-feminism
 Anarchism
 Anarchism and anarcho-capitalism
 Anarchism and animal rights
 Anarchism and capitalism
 Anarchism and Friedrich Nietzsche
 Anarchism and Islam
 Anarchism and Marxism
 Anarchism and nationalism
 Anarchism and the arts
 Anarchism and violence
 Anarchism in Africa
 Anarchism in America (film)
 Anarchism in Asia
 Anarchism in Australia
 Anarchism in Brazil
 Anarchism in Canada
 Anarchism in China
 Anarchism in Cuba
 Anarchism in England
 Anarchism in France
 Anarchism in Greece
 Anarchism in Iceland
 Anarchism in India
 Anarchism in Ireland
 Anarchism in Israel
 Anarchism in Italy
 Anarchism in Japan
 Anarchism in Korea
 Anarchism in Mexico
 Anarchism in Poland
 Anarchism in Russia
 Anarchism in Spain
 Anarchism in Sweden
 Anarchism in the United States
 Anarchism in Turkey
 Anarchism in Ukraine
 Anarchism in Vietnam
 Anarchism without adjectives
 Anarchism: A Documentary History of Libertarian Ideas
 Anarchist Black Cross
 Anarchist Black Cross Federation
 Anarchist Black Cross Network
 Anarchist Bookfair
 Anarchist Catalonia
 Anarchist communism
 Anarchist Exclusion Act
 Anarchist Federation (Britain and Ireland)
 Anarchist law
 Anarchist Manifesto
 Anarchist People of Color
 Anarchist schools of thought
 Anarchist St. Imier International
 Anarchist Studies
 Anarchist symbolism
 Anarchist terminology
 Anarchistic free school
 Anarchists (film)
 Anarchists Against the Wall
 Anarcho-capitalism
 Anarcho-capitalism and minarchism
 Anarcho-capitalist literature
 Anarcho-capitalist symbolism
 Anarcho-pacifism
 Anarcho-primitivism
 Anarcho-punk
 Anarcho-syndicalism
 Anarcho-Syndicalism (book)
 Anarcho-Syndicalist Review
 Anarcho-syndicalist symbolism
 Anarchy
 Anarchy (book)
 Anarchy Alive!
 Anarchy Archives
 Anarchy Comics
 Anarchy in the Age of Dinosaurs
 Anarchy Magazine
 Anarchy, State, and Utopia
 Anarchy: A Journal of Desire Armed
 Anarky
 Anarky (comic book)
 Anat Biletzki
 Anathon Aall
 Anatoly Lunacharsky
 Anatta
 Anava
 Anaxagoras
 Anaxarchus
 Anaxilaus
 Anaximander
 Anaximenes of Miletus
 Ancestral
 Ancestral relation
 Anchoring
 Ancient commentators project
 Ancient Greek philosophy
 Ancient philosophy
 Ancient skepticism
 Ancient Wisdom, Modern World
 And you are lynching Negroes
 Anders Chydenius
 Anders Nygren
 Anders Vilhelm Lundstedt
 Ando Shoeki
 André-François Deslandes
 André-Marie Ampère
 André Comte-Sponville
 André Glucksmann
 André Gorz
 André Malet (philosopher)
 André Malraux
 André of Neufchâteau
 Andrea Bonomi
 Andrea Cesalpino
 Andreas Kinneging
 Andreas Speiser
 Andrei Andreevich Markov
 Andrei Marga
 Andrej Grubacic
 Andres Luure
 Andrés Ortiz-Osés
 Andrew Baxter
 Andrew Bernstein
 Andrew Feenberg
 Andrew Janiak
 Andrew of Cornwall
 Andrew Pyle (philosopher)
 Andrew Seth Pringle-Pattison
 Andries Mac Leod
 Androcentrism
 Androcydes (Pythagorean)
 Android epistemology
 Andronicus of Rhodes
 Andrzej Mostowski
 Andrzej Towiański
 Andy Blunden
 Andy Clark
 Andy Warhol
 Anekantavada
 Ángel Rama
 Angelaki
 Angeli (novel)
 Angelo Galli
 Anger
 Angie Hobbs
 Anglo-Japanese style
 Angst
 Anguish
 Angus Taylor (philosopher)
 Anima mundi
 Anima mundi (spirit)
 Animal consciousness
 Animal Experimentation: Opposing Viewpoints
 Animal language
 Animal Liberation (book)
 Animal rights
 Animal spirits
 Animals in Buddhism
 Animistic fallacy
 Anioł Dowgird
 Anja Steinbauer
 Anna-Teresa Tymieniecka
 Anna Maria van Schurman
 Anne Conway, Viscountess Conway
 Anne Finch
 Anne Louise Germaine de Staël
 Annemarie Gethmann-Siefert
 Annemarie Mol
 Annette Baier
 Anniceris
 Anomalous monism
 Anomie
 Ansatz
 Anselm Jappe
 Anselm of Canterbury
 Anselm of Laon
 Anselme Bellegarrigue
 Ansgar Beckermann
 Answer to Job
 Answering the Question: What Is Enlightenment?
 Antahkarana
 Antanas Maceina
 Antecedent (logic)
 Antenor Orrego
 Anteo Zamboni
 Antepredicament
 Anthem (novella)
 Anthony Ashley-Cooper, 3rd Earl of Shaftesbury
 Anthony Collins
 Anthony Gottlieb
 Anthony John Patrick Kenny
 Anthony Kenny
 Anthony O'Hear
 Anthony of the Mother of God
 Anthony Quinton
 Anthony Quinton, Baron Quinton
 Anthony Rayson
 Anthony Thiselton
 Anthropic principle
 Anthropocentrism
 Anthropopath
 Anthropopathy
 Anthroposophy
 Anti-art
 Anti-authoritarianism
 Anti-clericalism
 Anti-communism
 Anti-consumerism
 Anti-Dühring
 Anti-environmentalism
 Anti-foundationalism
 Anti-Germans (communist current)
 Anti-modernism
 Anti-Œdipus
 Anti-psychiatry
 Anti-psychologism
 Anti-racist mathematics
 Anti-realism
 Anti-Revisionism
 Anti-Semite and Jew
 Anti-Semitism
 Anti-State Justice
 Anti-statism
 Anti-Supernaturalism
 Anti-systemic library
 Anti-voting
 Anti-work
 Anticonformism
 Antigone (Sophocles)
 Antihumanism
 Antimilitarism
 Antinatalism
 Antinomianism
 Antinomies
 Antinomy
 Antiochus Kantemir
 Antiochus of Ascalon
 Antipater
 Antipater of Cyrene
 Antipater of Tarsus
 Antipater of Tyre
 Antiperistasis
 Antiphon
 Antiphon (person)
 Antireductionism
 Antireligion
 Antiscience
 Antisthenes
 Antitheism
 Antithesis
 Antoine-Augustin Cournot
 Antoine Arnauld
 Antoine Augustin Cournot
 Antoine Destutt de Tracy
 Antoine Lavoisier
 Antoine Le Grand
 Anton Ambschel
 Anton Günther
 Anton Kržan
 Anton LaVey
 Anton Wilhelm Amo
 Antonin Sertillanges
 Antoninus (philosopher)
 Antonio Beccadelli
 Antonio Caso Andrade
 António Castanheira Neves
 Antonio Comellas y Cluet
 Antonio Cua
 António Damásio
 Antonio Genovesi
 Antonio Gramsci
 Antonio Labriola
 Antonio Negri
 Antonio Rosmini
 Antonio Rosmini-Serbati
 Antonio Téllez
 Antony Flew
 Antwerp school
 Anuario Filosófico
 Aous Shakra
 Apagoge
 Aparoksanubhuti
 Aparokshanubhuti
 Apatheia
 Apatheism
 Apeiron (cosmology)
 Aphorism
 Apocalypticism
 Apocatastasis
 Apodictic
 Apodicticity
 Apodosis
 Apollodorus of Seleucia
 Apollodorus the Epicurean
 Apollonian and Dionysian
 Apollonius Cronus
 Apollonius of Tyana
 Apollonius of Tyre (philosopher)
 Apologetics
 Apologism
 Apology (Plato)
 Apology (Xenophon)
 Apology of Aristides
 Aponia
 Apophasis
 Apophatic theology
 Apophenia
 Aporetic
 Aporia
 Aporime
 Aposteriori
 Appeal to advantage
 Appeal to authority
 Appeal to belief
 Appeal to consequences
 Appeal to emotion
 Appeal to fear
 Appeal to flattery
 Appeal to motive
 Appeal to nature
 Appeal to novelty
 Appeal to pity
 Appeal to probability
 Appeal to ridicule
 Appeal to spite
 Appeal to tradition
 Appellation
 Apperception
 Appiano Buonafede
 Applicative Universal Grammar
 Applied aesthetics
 Applied art
 Applied ethics
 Applied ontology
 Applied philosophy
 Apportionment paradox
 Approximation
 Aptitude
 Apuleius
 Arab transmission of the Classics to the West
 Arabic philosophy
 Arabic Sciences and Philosophy
 Aramesh Doustdar
 Arbeter Fraynd
 Arbitrariness
 Arbitration
 Arborescent
 Arcadia (play)
 Arcesilaus
 Archaeological ethics
 Arche
 Archē
 Archedemus of Tarsus
 Archeio-Marxism
 Archelaus (philosopher)
 Archetype
 Archibald Alison (author)
 Archibald Campbell (philosopher)
 Archie J. Bahm
 Archimedes
 Architectonic
 Archive Fever
 Archytas
 Arda Denkel
 Areopagitica
 Aretaic
 Aretaic turn
 Arete (moral virtue)
 Arete of Cyrene
 Aretology
 Argentine Libertarian Federation
 Argentine Regional Workers' Federation
 Argument
 Argument form
 Argument from a proper basis
 Argument from authority
 Argument from beauty
 Argument from consciousness
 Argument from degree
 Argument from design
 Argument from desire
 Argument from evil
 Argument from fallacy
 Argument from free will
 Argument from ignorance
 Argument from illusion
 Argument from inconsistent revelations
 Argument from love
 Argument from marginal cases
 Argument from miracles
 Argument from morality
 Argument from nonbelief
 Argument from poor design
 Argument from queerness
 Argument from Reason
 Argument from religious experience
 Argument from silence
 Argument in the alternative
 Argument map
 Argument to moderation
 Argumentation theory
 Arguments for eternity
 Arguments for the existence of God
 Argumentum ad baculum
 Argumentum ad crumenam
 Argumentum ad hominem
 Argumentum ad ignorantium
 Argumentum ad lapidem
 Argumentum ad lazarum
 Argumentum ad misericordiam
 Argumentum ad numerum
 Argumentum ad populum
 Argumentum ad verecundiam
 Arhat
 Ariadne's thread (logic)
 Arianism
 Ariel Salleh
 Arignote
 Arimneste
 Arindam Chakrabarti
 Aristides of Athens
 Aristion
 Aristippus
 Aristippus the Younger
 Aristo of Alexandria
 Aristo of Ceos
 Aristo of Chios
 Aristobulus of Paneas
 Aristoclea
 Aristocles of Messene
 Aristocracy
 Aristocreon
 Aristonymus
 Aristotelian ethics
 Aristotelian logic
 Aristotelian physics
 Aristotelian rhetoric
 Aristotelian Society
 Aristotelian Society for the Systematic Study of Philosophy
 Aristotelian theory of gravity
 Aristotelian view of a god
 Aristotelian view of God
 Aristotelianism
 Aristotle
 Aristotle's Masterpiece
 Aristotle's theory of universals
 Aristotle's views on women
 Aristotle's wheel paradox
 Aristotle for Everybody
 Aristoxenus
 Arithmetic
 Arithmetic hierarchy
 Arithmetization of analysis
 Arity
 Arius
 Arius Didymus
 Arkhē
 Armand Robin
 Armchair revolutionary
 Armin Mohler
 Arminianism
 Arne Johan Vetlesen
 Arne Naess
 Arne Næss
 Arno Ros
 Arnold Davidson
 Arnold Gehlen
 Arnold Geulincx
 Arnold Ruge
 Arnold J. Toynbee
 Arnouphis
 Aron Gurwitsch
 Arrian
 Arrow's impossibility theorem
 Arrow's paradox
 Arrow's theorem
 Arrow of time
 Arrow paradox
 Ars inveniendi
 Ars Poetica (Horace)
 Art
 Art and morality
 Art as Experience
 Art criticism
 Art Deco in Durban
 Art for art's sake
 Art forgery
 Art manifesto
 Art movement
 Art periods
 Arte Povera
 Artforum
 Arthur Balfour
 Arthur C. Danto
 Arthur Coleman Danto
 Arthur Collier
 Arthur Danto
 Arthur de Gobineau
 Arthur Drews
 Arthur F. Holmes
 Arthur Fine
 Arthur Koestler
 Arthur Lehning
 Arthur Linton Corbin
 Arthur Lipsett
 Arthur M. Young
 Arthur Moeller van den Bruck
 Arthur Norman Prior
 Arthur Oncken Lovejoy
 Arthur Pap
 Arthur Prior
 Arthur Schafer
 Arthur Schopenhauer
 Arthur Schopenhauer's aesthetics
 Arthur Stanley Eddington
 Arthur Willink
 Artificial brain
 Artificial consciousness
 Artificial intelligence
 Artificial language
 Artificial life
 Artist
 Artistic expression
 Artistic freedom
 Artistic inspiration
 Artistic interpretation
 Artistic merit
 Artistic revolution
 Artistic style
 Arto Haapala
 Arts and Crafts Movement
 Arts criticism
 Arturo Andrés Roig
 Artworld
 Arvi Grotenfelt
 Arya
 Arya Samaj
 Aryadeva
 As a Man Thinketh
 As I Lay Dying (novel)
 As I was going to St Ives
 As if
 As She Climbed Across the Table
 Asa Gray
 Asa Kasher
 Asanga
 Asceticism
 Asclepiades of Phlius
 Asclepiades the Cynic
 Asclepigenia
 Asclepiodotus (philosopher)
 Asclepiodotus of Alexandria
 Asclepius of Tralles
 Ascribed status
 Ascriptivism
 Aseity
 Ashanti Alston
 Ashcan School
 Asher Ginzberg
 Ashley Treatment
 Ashtamangala
 Asian values
 Asiatic mode of production
 Askapāda Gotama
 Asociación Continental Americana de Trabajadores
 Aspasius
 Assertion
 Assertoric
 Assi Rahbani
 Assisted suicide
 Association fallacy
 Association for Logic, Language and Information
 Association for Symbolic Logic
 Association for the Scientific Study of Consciousness
 Association of Autonomous Astronauts
 Association of ideas
 Associationism
 Associative law
 Āstika and nāstika
 Astrology
 Aśvaghoṣa
 Asymmetrical
 Ataraxia
 Ateneo de la Juventud
 Athanasius of Alexandria
 Atheism
 Atheist's Wager
 Atheist existentialism
 Athenaeus of Seleucia
 Athenian democracy
 Athenodoros Cananites
 Athenodoros Cordylion
 Athenodorus of Soli
 Athens
 Athīr al-Dīn al-Abharī
 Atisha
 Atlantis
 Atlas Shrugged
 Atman (Buddhism)
 Ātman (Buddhism)
 Atman (Hinduism)
 Atomic fact
 Atomic sentence
 Atomism
 Atonement in Christianity
 Atonement in Judaism
 Atopy (philosophy)
 Atrocity story
 Attacking Faulty Reasoning
 Attalus (Stoic)
 Attempt at a Critique of All Revelation
 Attentional bias
 Atticus (philosopher)
 Attitude (psychology)
 Attitude polarization
 Attorney–client privilege
 Attorney misconduct
 Attorney/client privilege
 Attribute grammar
 Attribution theory
 Attributional bias
 Auberon Herbert
 Auctoritas
 Auctoritates Aristotelis
 Aufheben
 Augmented Backus–Naur form
 Augoeides
 August Cieszkowski
 August Wilhelm Schlegel
 Auguste Comte
 Auguste Vaillant
 Augustin Bonnetty
 Augustin Souchy
 Augustine Eriugena
 Augustine of Hippo
 Augustinian Studies
 Augustinian values
 Augusto César Sandino
 Augusto Vera
 Augustus De Morgan
 Aulus Egnatius Priscillianus
 Aulus Gellius
 Aurel Kolnai
 Austin Farrer
 Austin Marsden Farrer
 Austin Woodbury
 Australasian Association of Philosophy
 Australasian Journal of Philosophy
 Australian materialism
 Australian realism
 Austrofascism
 Autarchism
 Authenticity (philosophy)
 Authoritarianism
 Authority
 Auto-destructive art
 Autocracy
 Autoepistemic logic
 Autological
 Automata theory
 Automated reasoning
 Automatic sequence
 Automaton
 Autonomedia
 Autonomism
 Autonomous Action
 Autonomy
 Autopoiesis
 Avadhuta Gita
 Availability heuristic
 Avant-garde
 Avant-Garde and Kitsch
 Avatar
 Avecebrol
 Avempace
 Average and total utilitarianism
 Averaging argument
 Averroes
 Averroës
 Averroism
 Aversion therapy
 Avicebrol
 Avicebron
 Avicenna
 Avicenna Prize
 Avicennism
 Avidya (Hinduism)
 Avidyā (Buddhism)
 Avishai Margalit
 Avital Ronell
 Avodah
 Avraham son of Rambam
 Avrum Stroll
 Awareness
 Awareness League
 Axel Hägerström
 Axel Honneth
 Axial Age
 Axiochus (dialogue)
 Axiology
 Axiom
 Axiom of abstraction
 Axiom of choice
 Axiom of comprehension
 Axiom of Equity
 Axiom of extensionality
 Axiom of infinity
 Axiom of projective determinacy
 Axiom of reducibility
 Axiom of replacement
 Axiom of separation
 Axiom S5
 Axiom schema
 Axiomatic method
 Axiomatic set theory
 Axiomatic system
 Axiomatization
 Axiothea of Phlius
 Ayatana
 Ayn al-Quzat Hamadani
 Ayn Rand
 Ayn Rand: A Sense of Life
 Ayn Rand: The Russian Radical
 Ayurveda
 Ayyavazhi
 Ayyavazhi phenomenology
 Azizah Y. al-Hibri
 Aztec philosophy

B 

 B-series
 B-Theory of time
 B. F. Skinner
 B. R. Ambedkar
 B. Traven
 Babette Babich
 Baby K
 Backgammon
 Backus–Naur form
 Backward causation
 Backward chaining
 Bad faith
 Bad faith (existentialism)
 Baden School
 Bahmanyār
 Bahshamiyya
 Bahya ibn Paquda
 Baker Brownell
 Balance (metaphysics)
 Balance of nature
 Balangoda Ananda Maitreya
 Baltasar Gracián
 Balthasar Bekker
 Banality of evil
 Banausos
 Bandwagon effect
 Bantu Philosophy
 Baptista Mantuanus
 Baptists in the history of separation of church and state
 Barba non facit philosophum
 Barbara
 Barbara Forrest
 Barbara Herrnstein Smith
 Barber paradox
 Barbershop paradox
 Barbizon school
 Barcan formula
 Barcelona May Days
 Bardo
 Bare particular
 Bargaining theory
 Barhaspatya sutras
 Barlaam of Seminara
 Baron d'Holbach
 Baron de Montesquieu
 Baron Herbert of Cherbury
 Baroque
 Baroque Revival architecture
 Barracks communism
 Barrie Karp
 Barrows Dunham
 Barry Loewer
 Barry Smith (ontologist)
 Barry Stroud
 Bartholomäus Keckermann
 Bartholomew Des Bosses
 Bartholomew Keckermann
 Bartholomew of Bologna (philosopher)
 Bartolomé de Medina
 Bartolommeo Spina
 Bartolus de Saxoferrato
 Baruch Spinoza
 Barwise prize
 Barzillai Quaife
 Bas C. van Fraassen
 Bas Haring
 Bas van Fraassen
 Base and superstructure
 Base and superstructure (Marxism)
 Base rate fallacy
 Basic belief
 Basic Limiting Principle
 Basic norm
 Basic Points Unifying the Theravāda and the Mahāyāna
 Basil Mitchell (academic)
 Basilides
 Basilides (Stoic)
 Basilides the Epicurean
 Basilios Bessarion
 Batis of Lampsacus
 Batman: Anarky
 Battle of Peregonovka (1919)
 Bauhaus
 Bay Area Figurative Movement
 Bayes' theorem
 Bayes's rule
 Bayes's theorem
 Bayesian probability
 Bayesianism
 Beatific vision
 Béatrice Longuenesse
 Beatriz Sarlo
 Beauty
 Becoming
 Becoming (philosophy)
 Bedeutung
 Beelzebub's Tales to His Grandson
 Beerwolf
 Begging the question
 Begriffsschrift
 Behavior therapy
 Behavioral script
 Behavioralism
 Behaviorism
 Behaviourism
 Behind the Mirror: A Search for a Natural History of Human Knowledge
 Behold a Pale Horse (film)
 Being
 Being and becoming
 Being and Nothingness
 Being and Time
 Being beautiful in spirit
 Being for itself
 Being in itself
 Béla Balázs
 Béla Hamvas
 Belief
 Belief-Desire-Intention model
 Belief-in
 Belief bias
 Belief in
 Belief revision
 Bell's inequality
 Bell's theorem
 Bellum omnium contra omnes
 Belmont Report
 Ben Salem Himmich
 Benedetto Croce
 Benedict de Spinoza
 Benedict Pereira
 Benedictus Spinoza
 Benedito Nunes
 Beneficence
 Benjamin Apthorp Gould Fuller
 Benjamin Constant
 Benjamin Franklin
 Benjamin Lee (academic)
 Benjamin Paul Blood
 Benjamin Peirce
 Benjamin Tucker
 Benjamin Whichcote
 Benny Lévy
 Benoît Broutchoux
 Benoît de Maillet
 Benson Mates
 Berlin Circle
 Bernard-Henri Lévy
 Bernard A. O. Williams
 Bernard Arthur Owen Williams
 Bernard Bolzano
 Bernard Bosanquet (philosopher)
 Bernard d'Espagnat
 Bernard de Fontenelle
 Bernard Delfgaauw
 Bernard Gert
 Bernard le Bovier de Fontenelle
 Bernard Le Bovier de Fontenelle
 Bernard Lonergan
 Bernard Mandeville
 Bernard Mayo
 Bernard Narokobi
 Bernard Nieuwentyt
 Bernard of Chartres
 Bernard of Clairvaux
 Bernard of Trilia
 Bernard Philip Kelly
 Bernard Rollin
 Bernard Silvestris
 Bernard Stiegler
 Bernard Williams
 Bernard Yack
 Bernardino Telesio
 Bernardino Varisco
 Bernhard Riemann
 Bernoulli's principle
 Bernoulli's theorem
 Berry's paradox
 Bert Mosselmans
 Berthold of Moosburg
 Berthold Wulf
 Bertil Mårtensson
 Bertrand paradox (economics)
 Bertrand paradox (probability)
 Bertrand's box paradox
 Bertrand Arthur William Russell
 Bertrand de Jouvenel
 Bertrand Russell
 Bertrand Russell's views on philosophy
 Bertrand Russell's views on society
 Best of all possible worlds
 Bête machine
 Betrayal
 Between Facts and Norms
 Between Heaven and Hell (novel)
 Between Past and Future
 Beuron Art School
 Beyond Belief: Science, Religion, Reason and Survival
 Beyond Freedom and Dignity
 Beyond Good and Evil
 Beyond the Pleasure Principle
 Bhagavad Gita
 Bhakti
 Bhartrhari
 Bhava
 Bhavanga
 Bhāvaviveka
 Bhedabheda
 Bhikhu Parekh, Baron Parekh
 Bhumi (Buddhism)
 Bias
 Bias blind spot
 Bible
 Biblical literalism
 Bibliography for Ayn Rand and Objectivism
 Biconditional
 Biconditional elimination
 Biconditional introduction
 Biennio rosso
 Big Book (thought experiment)
 Bigram
 Bill Martin (philosophy)
 Bilocation
 Binary opposition
 Biocentric universe
 Biocentrism (ethics)
 Biodefense
 Bioethics
 Bioethics (journal)
 Biofact (philosophy)
 Biofacticity
 Biographia Literaria
 Biographical fallacy
 Biological determinism
 Biological naturalism
 Biological warfare
 Biomedical tissue
 Bion of Borysthenes
 Biopolitics
 Biopower
 Biosafety
 Biosecurity
 Biosophy
 Biotic Baking Brigade
 Bisexuality
 Bite the bullet
 Bivalence
 Bjarni Jónsson
 Bl(A)ck Tea Society
 Black-Body Theory and the Quantum Discontinuity
 Black anarchism
 Black Artists Group
 Black Arts Movement
 Black bloc
 Black box
 Black box theory
 Black existentialism
 Black Flag (newspaper)
 Black Laundry
 Black Mask (anarchists)
 Black Panther Party
 Black Sotnia
 Black Star (anarchist group)
 Black swan theory
 Blackbird Raum
 Blackwell Companion to Philosophy
 Blaise Pascal
 Blame
 Blanquism
 Bleen
 Blindsight
 Blockhead (thought experiment)
 Blossius
 Bluestocking (journal)
 Bluestockings (bookstore)
 Blyenbergh
 Boasting
 Boatmen of Thessaloníki
 Bob Black
 Bob Hale (philosopher)
 Bodhi
 Bodhimandala
 Bodhisattva Precepts
 Bodhisena
 Body donation
 Body of Knowledge
 Body politic
 Body without organs
 Bodymind
 Boethius
 Boethus of Sidon
 Boethus of Sidon (Stoic)
 Boetius of Dacia
 Bohm interpretation
 Bohr–Einstein debates
 Bohr Einstein debate
 Bolam v Friern Hospital Management Committee
 Bolshevik
 Bolus of Mendes
 Bonapartism (Marxism)
 Bonaventure
 Boncompagno da Signa
 Bonifaty Kedrov
 Bonini's paradox
 Bonnie Honig
 Bonnie Steinbock
 Bonnot Gang
 Book of Causes
 Book of Changes
 Book of Life
 Boolean algebra (logic)
 Boolean grammar
 Bootstrapping
 Borden Parker Bowne
 Boredom
 Boris Chicherin
 Boris Furlan
 Boris Grushin
 Boris Hessen
 Borussian myth
 Bound variable
 Bourgeois
 Bourgeois socialism
 Bourgeoisie
 Bowling Green Studies in Applied Philosophy
 Boyd Henry Bode
 Boyle Lectures
 Bracha L. Ettinger
 Bracketing (phenomenology)
 Bracketing paradox
 Brad Hooker
 Brahma
 Brahmacharya
 Brahman
 Brahmavihara
 Brahmin
 Brahmo Samaj
 Brain
 Brain-in-a-vat theory
 Brain dump
 Brain event
 Brain in a vat
 Brainstorm machine
 Brainstorms
 Brand Blanshard
 Brandon Darby
 Branko Bošnjak
 Brazilian Workers Confederation
 Breaking the Spell (film)
 Breaking the Spell: Religion as a Natural Phenomenon
 Brethren of Purity
 Brian Barry
 Brian Boyd
 Brian David Ellis
 Brian Davies (philosopher)
 Brian Klug
 Brian Leftow
 Brian Leiter
 Brian MacKenzie Infoshop
 Brian Massumi
 Brian O'Shaughnessy (philosopher)
 Brian Orend
 Brian Skyrms
 Brian Weatherson
 Bridge ethics
 Brie Gertler
 Brights movement
 British Empiricists
 British Humanist Association
 British idealism
 British Idealism
 British Journal of Aesthetics
 British Philosophical Association
 British philosophy
 Broadway Barks
 Bronisław Trentowski
 Bronius Kuzmickas
 Brontinus
 Brother Wolf
 Brownie points
 Bruce Lee
 Bruce Weinstein
 Bruce Wilshire
 Brunetto Latini
 Bruno Bauch
 Bruno Bauer
 Bruno de Finetti
 Bruno Leoni
 Brute fact
 Bryan Caplan
 Bryan Magee
 Bryson of Achaea
 Bryson of Heraclea
 Buchmanism
 Budaya
 Buddha-nature
 Buddhaghosa
 Buddhahood
 Buddhapālita
 Buddhism
 Buddhism and evolution
 Buddhist anarchism
 Buddhist ethics
 Buddhist philosophy
 Buddhist schools
 Buddhist view of marriage
 Buenaventura Durruti
 Bullshit
 Bulverism
 Bunched logic
 Bundle theory
 Bundle theory of the self
 Burali-Forte paradox
 Burali-Forti's paradox
 Burchard de Volder
 Burden of proof (logical fallacy)
 Bureaucracy
 Bureaucratic collectivism
 Burghart Schmidt
 Buridan's ass
 Burleigh Taylor Wilkins
 Burrhus Frederic Skinner
 Burton Dreben
 Business ethics
 Buttered cat paradox
 By any means necessary
 Byzantine philosophy
 Byzantine rhetoric
 Byzantinism

C 

 C. Anthony Anderson
 C. D. Broad
 C. E. M. Joad
 C. I. Lewis
 C. Lloyd Morgan
 C. S. Lewis
 C. S. Lewis bibliography
 C. Stephen Evans
 C. T. K. Chari
 C. A. J. Coady
 Cabbala
 Café Philosophique
 Cahal Daly
 Cai Yuanpei
 Caigentan
 Cairo Declaration on Human Rights in Islam
 Cajetan
 Calcidius
 Calculus
 Calculus of structures
 Calculus ratiocinator
 Calippus of Syracuse
 Callicles
 Calliphon
 Calliphon of Croton
 Callippus
 Callistratus (sophist)
 Calvin Normore
 Calvin Seerveld
 Calvinism
 Camas Bookstore and Infoshop
 Cambridge change
 Cambridge Philosophical Society
 Cambridge Platonism
 Cambridge Platonists
 Camera del Lavoro
 Camera obscura
 Camilo Cienfuegos
 Camp (style)
 Canadian Journal of Philosophy
 Canadian Society for History and Philosophy of Mathematics
 Candace Vogler
 Candide
 Candrakīrti
 Canonical form (Boolean algebra)
 Cantor's paradox
 Cantor's theorem
 Capacity
 Capital accumulation
 Capital punishment
 Capital, Volume I
 Capitalism
 Capitalism: The Unknown Ideal
 Capitalist mode of production
 Capitalist realism
 Cappadocian Fathers
 Carceral state
 Cardinal Mercier Prize for International Philosophy
 Cardinal utility
 Cardinal virtues
 Cardinality
 Care
 Care Not Killing
 Carew Arthur Meredith
 Cargo cult science
 Carl Cohen
 Carl Dahlhaus
 Carl Elliott (philosopher)
 Carl Friedrich Gauss
 Carl Friedrich von Weizsäcker
 Carl G. Hempel
 Carl Ginet
 Carl Gustav Carus
 Carl Gustav Hempel
 Carl Gustav Jung
 Carl Hempel
 Carl Joachim Friedrich
 Carl Jung
 Carl Linnaeus
 Carl Mitcham
 Carl Schmitt
 Carl Stumpf
 Carl von Linnaeus
 Carlo Cattaneo
 Carlo Lottieri
 Carlo Michelstaedter
 Carlo Penco
 Carlo Rosselli
 Carlo Tresca
 Carlos Bernardo González Pecotche
 Carlos Brandt
 Carlos Castrodeza
 Carlos Castaneda
 Carlos Cirne Lima
 Carlos Santiago Nino
 Carlos Vaz Ferreira
 Carmen Laforet
 Ramsey sentence
 Carneades
 Carneiscus
 Carol Gilligan
 Caroline Joan S. Picart
 Carolingian renaissance
 Carolus Sigonius
 Carolyn Merchant
 Carsun Chang
 Cartesian anxiety
 Cartesian circle
 Cartesian demon
 Cartesian doubt
 Cartesian dualism
 Cartesian materialism
 Cartesian Meditations
 Cartesian Other
 Cartesian product
 Cartesian Self
 Cartesian skepticism
 Cartesian theater
 Cartesianism
 Cārvāka
 Carveth Read
 Case-based reasoning
 Casimir Lewy
 Caspar Isenkrahe
 Cassius Longinus (philosopher)
 Casuistry
 Cat's Cradle
 Catch-22 (logic)
 Catechism of a Revolutionary
 Categoriae decem
 Categorical
 Categorical imperative
 Categorical logic
 Categorical proposition
 Categorical theory
 Categoricity
 Categories (Aristotle)
 Categories (Peirce)
 Categories of the understanding
 Categorization
 Category (Kant)
 Category (philosophy)
 Category mistake
 Category of being
 Category theory
 Catharine Macaulay
 Catharsis
 Catherine Clément
 Catherine Elgin
 Catherine Malabou
 Catherine of Siena
 Catherine Perret
 Catherine Trotter
 Catherine Trotter Cockburn
 Catholic guilt
 Catholic Probabilism
 Catius
 Cato Maior de Senectute
 Cato the Elder
 Cato the Younger
 Catonism
 Causa sui
 Causal-historical theory of reference
 Causal adequacy principle
 Causal chain
 Causal closure
 Causal decision theory
 Causal determinism
 Causal diagram
 Causal Markov condition
 Causal relation
 Causal theory of proper names
 Causal theory of reference
 Causalism
 Causality
 Causality loop
 Causation (law)
 Causative verb
 Cause
 Cavalcante de' Cavalcanti
 Cebes
 Celestial spheres
 Célestin Bouglé
 Celia Green
 Celine's laws
 Cellular automaton
 Celsus
 Cemal Yildirim
 Center Leo Apostel for Interdisciplinary Studies
 Centre de recherche et de documentation sur Hegel
 Centre for Applied Ethics
 Centre for Applied Philosophy and Public Ethics (CAPPE)
 Centre for History and Philosophy of Science, University of Leeds
 Cercidas
 Cercops
 Certainty
 César Chesneau Dumarsais
 César Dávila Andrade
 Cesare Beccaria
 Cesare Cremonini (philosopher)
 Ceteris paribus
 CH
 Ch'i
 Ch'ien
 Ch'ien Mu
 Ch'ing
 Ch'uan
 Chaeremon of Alexandria
 Chaerephon
 Chaeron of Pellene
 Chaïm Perelman
 Chain of events
 Chaldean Oracles
 Chamaeleon (philosopher)
 Chanakya
 Chance (Ancient Greek concept)
 Chandragomin
 Change
 Chantal Maillard
 Chao Cuo
 Chaos
 Chaos theory
 Chaotic system
 Character Strengths and Virtues (book)
 Character structure
 Character traits
 Characteristica universalis
 Chariot Allegory
 Charismatic authority
 Charity (practice)
 Charity (virtue)
 Charity International
 Charles A. Moore
 Charles Babbage
 Charles Batteux
 Charles Bernard Renouvier
 Charles Blount (deist)
 Charles Bonnet
 Charles Butterworth (philosopher)
 Charles Carroll Everett
 Charles Darwin
 Charles de Secondat, baron de Montesquieu
 Charles Fourier
 Charles François d'Abra de Raconis
 Charles Frankel
 Charles Fremont Dight
 Charles Graves (bishop)
 Charles Hartshorne
 Charles Kay Ogden
 Charles L. Stevenson
 Charles Leonard Hamblin
 Charles Leslie Stevenson
 Charles Louis de Secondat, Baron de Montesquieu
 Charles Lutwidge Dodgson
 Charles Malato
 Charles Maurras
 Charles Morris, Baron Morris of Grasmere
 Charles Parsons (philosopher)
 Charles Renouvier
 Charles Robert Darwin
 Charles Sanders Peirce
 Charles Sanders Peirce bibliography
 Charles Secrétan
 Charles Stevenson
 Charles Taylor (philosopher)
 Charles W. Morris
 Charles Waddington (philosopher)
 Charles Winquist
 Charlotte Perkins Gilman
 Charlotte Wilson
 Charmadas
 Charmides (dialogue)
 Charter for Compassion
 Chastity
 Chatral Rinpoche
 Chauncey Wright
 Chaz Bufe
 Chemism
 Chen Chung-hwan
 Chen Daqi
 Chen Duxiu
 Chen Hongmou
 Cheng Hao
 Cheng Yi (philosopher)
 Chernoe Znamia
 Cherry picking (fallacy)
 Cheung Kam Ching
 Chia I
 Chia Yi
 Chicago school (mathematical analysis)
 Chicken or the egg
 Chih
 Chih-I
 Chih Tun
 Child labour
 China brain
 Chinese Classics
 Chinese Legalism
 Chinese philosophy
 Chinese room
 Chinese world
 Chinoiserie
 Chinul
 Chion of Heraclea
 Chivalry
 Chöd
 Choe Chung
 Chögyam Trungpa
 Choice
 Choice-supportive bias
 Choice sequence
 Chomsky hierarchy
 Chomsky normal form
 Choosing
 Chora
 Choricius of Gaza
 Chovot ha-Levavot
 Chrematistics
 Chris Bobonich
 Chris Crass
 Chris Huebner
 Christiaan Cornelissen
 Christiaan Huygens
 Christian anarchism
 Christian August Crusius
 Christian de Quincey
 Christian Discourses
 Christian ethics
 Christian existentialism
 Christian Friedrich Hebbel
 Christian Garve
 Christian Hermann Weisse
 Christian humanism
 Christian Kabbalah
 Christian materialism
 Christian philosophy
 Christian Realism
 Christian Thomasius
 Christian von Ehrenfels
 Christian Wolff (philosopher)
 Christianity and environmentalism
 Christine Buci-Glucksmann
 Christine de Pizan
 Christine Korsgaard
 Christine Ladd-Franklin
 Christofascism
 Christological argument
 Christology
 Christoph Gottfried Bardili
 Christoph Meiners
 Christoph Schrempf
 Christoph von Sigwart
 Christopher Cherniak
 Christopher D. Green
 Christopher Fynsk
 Christopher Jacob Boström
 Christopher Janaway
 Christopher Norris (critic)
 Christopher Peacocke
 Christopher Potter (author)
 Christopher R. Phillips
 Christos Yannaras
 Chronocentrism
 Chronological snobbery
 Chronology protection conjecture
 Chrysanthius
 Chrysippus
 Chrysorrhoas
 Chu Anping
 Chu Hsi
 Chuck Munson
 Chumbawamba
 Chün-tzu
 Chung-ying Cheng
 Chung-yung
 Chung Yung
 Chunyu Kun
 Church's theorem
 Church's thesis
 Church–Turing thesis
 Church–Turing–Deutsch principle
 Church fathers
 Cicero
 Cienfuegos press
 Cincinnati Time Store
 Cindy Milstein
 Cinema 1: The Movement Image
 Cipriano Mera
 Circle of Tchaikovsky
 Circular cause and consequence
 Circular definition
 Circular reasoning
 Circumcision controversies
 Citationality
 Citizen Cyborg
 Citizenship
 City of God (book)
 Civic humanism
 Civic virtue
 Civics
 Civil discourse
 Civil disobedience
 Civil liberties
 Civil rights
 Civil society
 Civil union
 Civilization and Its Discontents
 Claim right
 Clairvoyance
 Clare W. Graves
 Clarembald of Arras
 Clarence Irving Lewis
 Clarity of scripture
 Clarity test
 Class (philosophy)
 Class collaboration
 Class consciousness
 Class struggle
 Classical conditioning
 Classical liberalism
 Classical logic
 Classical mechanics
 Classical Realism
 Classical republicanism
 Classical theism
 Classicism
 Classics
 Classification of the sciences (Peirce)
 Classificatory disputes about art
 Classless society
 Claude-Arien Helvetius
 Claude Adrien Helvétius
 Claude Buffier
 Claude Henri de Rouvroy, comte de Saint-Simon
 Claude Lefort
 Claude Lévi-Strauss
 Claude Lévi-Strauss
 Claude Tresmontant
 Claudio Canaparo
 Claudio Ulpiano
 Claudius Maximus
 Claus Emmeche
 Clause (logic)
 Cleanliness
 Cleanthes
 Clearchus of Soli
 Cleinias of Tarentum
 Clémence Royer
 Clemens Baeumker
 Clemens Timpler
 Clement Greenberg
 Clement of Alexandria
 Clément Rosset
 Cleobulus
 Cleomedes
 Cleomenes the Cynic
 Clerical fascism
 Clerical philosophers
 Clericalism
 Clifford Harper
 Clifford Williams (academic)
 Climate ethics
 Clinamen
 Clinical death
 Clinical equipoise
 Clinomachus
 Clitomachus (philosopher)
 Clitophon (dialogue)
 Clive Bell
 Clive Staples Lewis
 CLODO
 Cloning
 Close reading
 Closed circle
 Closed concept
 Closed formula
 Closed loop
 Closed sentence
 Closed world assumption
 Cloudesley
 Clustering illusion
 Co-premise
 Coase theorem
 Code (law)
 Coercion
 Cogency
 Cogito (magazine)
 Cogito ergo sum
 Cognition
 Cognitive architecture
 Cognitive bias
 Cognitive closure (philosophy)
 Cognitive description
 Cognitive development
 Cognitive dissonance
 Cognitive liberty
 Cognitive map
 Cognitive meaning
 Cognitive module
 Cognitive neuroscience
 Cognitive ontology
 Cognitive psychology
 Cognitive relativism
 Cognitive revolution
 Cognitive science
 Cognitive science of mathematics
 Cognitive synonymy
 Cognitivism (ethics)
 Coherence (philosophical gambling strategy)
 Coherence theory of truth
 Coherentism
 Coimbra commentaries
 Coimbra group
 Cointerpretability
 Colin Howson
 Colin McGinn
 Colin Murray Turbayne
 Colin Wilson
 Collapse (journal)
 Collapse theories (quantum mechanics)
 Collective belief
 Collective memory
 Collective responsibility
 Collective unconscious
 Collectivism and individualism
 Collectivist anarchism
 Collectivity
 Collège international de philosophie
 Collegium Conimbricense
 Colloque Walter Lippmann
 Colloquial language
 Color
 Color Field
 Color realism (philosophy)
 Colotes
 Combinational logic
 Combinatory logic
 Comedy
 Comenius
 Comité Consultatif National d'Ethique
 Commensurability (ethics)
 Commensurability (philosophy of science)
 Commentaria in Aristotelem Graeca
 Commentaries on Aristotle
 Commentaries on Plato
 Commission of Anarchist Relations
 Committee for the Scientific Examination of Religion
 Commodification
 Commodity (Marxism)
 Commodity fetishism
 Commodity form theory
 Common good
 Common Ground Collective
 Common knowledge
 Common knowledge (logic)
 Common law
 Common ownership
 Common rule
 Common sense
 Common sense and the Diallelus
 Common sense reasoning
 Commonsense reasoning
 Communication
 Communication theory
 Communicative action
 Communicative rationality
 Communism
 Communitarianism
 Community
 Community arts
 Communization
 Compactness
 Compactness theorem
 Comparatio
 Compassion
 Compassionate conservatism
 Compatibilism
 Compatibilism and incompatibilism
 Compensation (essay)
 Compensationism
 Completeness (logic)
 Completeness theorem
 Complexity
 Composition (logical fallacy)
 Composition of Causes
 Compositionality
 Compossibility
 Compossible
 Compound question
 Comprehension (logic)
 Compromise
 Computability
 Computability logic
 Computable
 Computational complexity
 Computational epistemology
 Computational humor
 Computational theories of mind
 Computational theory of mind
 Computer ethics
 Computer modeling
 Computer program
 Computer science
 Computer theory
 Computers
 Comtism
 Conatus
 Concept
 Concept and object
 Concepts
 Conceptual analysis
 Conceptual art
 Conceptual definition
 Conceptual framework
 Conceptual metaphor
 Conceptual model
 Conceptual necessity
 Conceptual role semantics
 Conceptual scheme
 Conceptual system
 Conceptualism
 Concerned Philosophers for Peace
 Conciliarism
 Conciliation
 Concluding Unscientific Postscript to Philosophical Fragments
 Conclusive evidence
 Concord School of Philosophy
 Concrescence
 Concretion
 Concretism
 Concupiscence
 Condemnations of 1210–1277
 Condensed detachment
 Conditio sine qua non
 Condition of possibility
 Conditional probability
 Conditional proof
 Conditioned disjunction
 Condorcet
 Condorcet winner
 Conduct
 Confederación Nacional del Trabajo
 Confederalism
 Confédération nationale du travail
 Configurations
 Confirmation
 Confirmation bias
 Confirmation holism
 Confirmational holism
 Conflict between good and evil
 Conflict of interest
 Conflict theory
 Conformism
 Confucian Analects
 Confucian philosophy
 Confucian view of marriage
 Confucianism
 Confucianism in Indonesia
 Confucius
 Confusion of the inverse
 Congruence bias
 Conimbricenses
 Conjecture
 Conjectures and Refutations
 Conjunction elimination
 Conjunction fallacy
 Conjunction introduction
 Conjunctive grammar
 Conjunctive normal form
 Connectionism
 Connectives
 Connexive logic
 Connotation
 Conscience
 Conscience clause (medical)
 Conscious automatism
 Conscious mind
 Consciousness
 Consciousness-only
 Consciousness and Cognition
 Consciousness Explained
 Consensual crime
 Consensual living
 Consensus
 Consensus decision-making
 Consensus democracy
 Consensus reality
 Consensus theory of truth
 Consent
 Consent theory
 Consequence relation
 Consequent
 Consequentia mirabilis
 Consequentialism
 Consequentialist justifications of the state
 Consequentialist libertarianism
 Conservation (ethic)
 Conservation biology
 Conservation ethic
 Conservation movement
 Conservatism
 Considerations on Representative Government
 Consilience
 Consistent life ethic
 Consolatio Literary Genre
 Consolation of Philosophy
 Constance Naden
 Constant capital
 Constant sum game
 Constantin Brunner
 Constantin Noica
 Constantin Rădulescu-Motru
 Constantin Schifirneţ
 Constantin Stere
 Constantine of Kostenets
 Constantinos Speras
 Constitution
 Constitution of the Athenians (Aristotle)
 Constitution of the Athenians (Pseudo-Xenophon)
 Constitutional law
 Constitutional right
 Constitutionalism
 Construct (philosophy of science)
 Constructible universe
 Constructive dilemma
 Constructive empiricism
 Constructive realism
 Constructivism (art)
 Constructivism (mathematics)
 Constructivist epistemology
 Constructivist Foundations
 Consubstantiation
 Consumerism
 Consumption of fixed capital
 Container (Type theory)
 Container space
 Containment
 Contemporary anarchism
 Contemporary Islamic philosophy
 Contemporary philosophy
 Contemporary Political Theory
 Contemporary Pragmatism
 Contemporary Whitehead Studies
 Contentment
 Context-free grammar
 Context-free language
 Context-sensitive grammar
 Context-sensitive language
 Context principle
 Contextual empiricism
 Contextualism
 Contiguity
 Continental philosophy
 Contingency
 Contingency (philosophy)
 Contingency, irony, and solidarity
 Contingent
 Continuity (fiction)
 Continuum fallacy
 Continuum hypothesis
 Continuum of Humanist Education
 Contra Celsum
 Contra principia negantem disputari non potest
 Contract theory
 Contractarianism
 Contractualism
 Contradiction
 Contradictions
 Contraposition
 Contraposition (traditional logic)
 Contrapositive
 Contrast effect
 Contrast theory of meaning
 Contrastivism
 Contributions to Philosophy (From Enowning)
 Contributory value
 Control (management)
 Controversy over Cantor's theory
 Convention (norm)
 Convention T
 Conventionalism
 Convergence (series)
 Conversational implicature
 Converse accident
 Converse implication
 Converse nonimplication
 Converse relation
 Conversion (logic)
 Convivio
 Convolution (computer science)
 Cool (aesthetic)
 Cooperation
 Cooperative federalism
 Cooperative principle
 Coordination problem
 Coordinative definition
 Copernican principle
 Copernican revolution
 Copernican Revolution (metaphor)
 Copula (linguistics)
 Cora Diamond
 Core ontology
 Corelative
 Coriscus of Scepsis
 Corliss Lamont
 Cornel West
 Cornelian dilemma
 Cornelio Fabro
 Cornelis Willem Opzoomer
 Cornelius Castoriadis
 Cornelius de Pauw
 Cornell realism
 Corollary
 Corporate behaviour
 Corporate crime
 Corporate nationalism
 Corporate social responsibility
 Corporate statism
 Corporatism
 Corpus Aristotelicum
 Correlation does not imply causation
 Correlative-based fallacies
 Correspondence theory of truth
 Corresponding conditional (logic)
 Corroboration
 Corruption (philosophical concept)
 Cosimo Boscaglia
 Cosmic consciousness
 Cosmic pluralism
 Cosmicism
 Cosmocentrism
 Cosmogony
 Cosmographia (Bernard Silvestris)
 Cosmological argument
 Cosmology
 Cosmology (metaphysics)
 Cosmopolitanism
 Cosmos
 Cosmotheology
 Cost-benefit analysis
 Costanzo Preve
 Costas Douzinas
 Council communism
 Count Lev Nikolaevich Tolstoi
 Count noun
 Richard von Coudenhove-Kalergi
 Countable
 Counter-Enlightenment
 Counterargument
 Counterexample
 Counterfactual conditional
 Counterfactual conditionals
 Counterfactuals
 Counterinduction
 Counterintuitive
 Counterpart theory
 Counting
 Coup d'État: A Practical Handbook
 Courage
 Course in General Linguistics
 Covering-law model
 Covering law model
 Cowardice
 Cowley Club
 CPNSS
 Craig's theorem
 Craig reduct
 Crantor
 Crass
 Crates of Athens
 Crates of Mallus
 Crates of Thebes
 Cratippus of Pergamon
 Cratylism
 Cratylus
 Cratylus (dialogue)
 Cream City Collectives
 Creation ex nihilo
 Creation myth
 Creationism
 Creative accounting
 Creative destruction
 Creative Evolution (book)
 Creativity
 Credibility
 Credo quia absurdum
 Credo quia absurdum est
 Credo ut intelligam
 Crescens the Cynic
 Cressida Heyes
 Cries and Whispers
 Crime
 Crime against humanity
 Crime and punishment
 Crime and Punishment
 CrimethInc.
 CrimethInc. Guerilla Film Series, Volume One
 CrimethInc. N©! license
 CrimethInc. publications
 Criminal justice
 Crinis
 Crispin Sartwell
 Crispin Wright
 Cristina Bicchieri
 Cristoforo Landino
 Criteria of truth
 Criterion
 Critias (dialogue)
 Critic
 Critica Sociale
 Critical discourse analysis
 Critical historiography
 Critical Language Awareness
 Critical legal studies
 Critical Mass
 Critical pedagogy
 Critical philosophy
 Critical race theory
 Critical rationalism
 Critical reading
 Critical realism
 Critical social thought
 Critical theory
 Critical thinking
 Critical vocabulary
 Criticism of capitalism
 Criticism of Christianity
 Criticism of Hinduism
 Criticism of Islam
 Criticism of Jesus
 Criticism of Judaism
 Criticism of monotheism
 Criticism of postmodernism
 Criticism of religion
 Criticism of the Bible
 Criticism of the Catholic Church
 Criticism of the Latter Day Saint movement
 Criticism of the Qur'an
 Criticisms of anarchism
 Criticisms of electoralism
 Critique
 Critique (Journal of Socialist Theory)
 Critique of Cynical Reason
 Critique of Dialectical Reason
 Critique of Hegel's Philosophy of Right
 Critique of ideology
 Critique of Judgement
 Critique of Practical Reason
 Critique of Pure Reason
 Critiques of Slavoj Žižek
 Crito
 Critolaus
 Cronaca Sovversiva
 Cronius the Pythagorean
 Crooked Timber
 Crucial experiment
 Cruelty
 Crusties
 Crypto-anarchism
 Crypto-fascism
 Crystallized self
 Ctheory
 Cuban Libertarian Movement
 Cubism
 Cultural bias
 Cultural evolution
 Cultural hegemony
 Cultural history
 Cultural identity
 Cultural influence of Plato's Republic
 Cultural materialism (anthropology)
 Cultural materialism (cultural studies)
 Cultural nationalism
 Cultural relativism
 Cultural studies
 Culture
 Culture of life
 Culture of the Song Dynasty
 Cum hoc ergo propter hoc
 Cura te ipsum
 Curie
 Curiosity
 Curious George Brigade
 Curry's paradox
 Curt John Ducasse
 Curve fitting problem
 Cusa
 Cusanus
 Cut-elimination theorem
 Cuteness
 Cyberethics
 Cybernetics
 Cyborg theory
 Cyclic history
 Cynic epistles
 Cynical Realism
 Cynicism (contemporary)
 Cynicism (philosophy)
 Cyphernomicon
 Cyrenaics
 Cyril of Alexandria
 Cyropaedia
 Czech philosophy
 Czesław Lejewski
 Czesław Znamierowski

Philosophy